Clostera pigra, the small chocolate-tip, is a moth of the family Notodontidae. The species was first described by Johann Siegfried Hufnagel in 1766. It is a Palearctic species found from Europe ranging to Morocco in the south and eastern Asia in the east.

The wingspan is 22–27 mm. Imagos (adults) are dark brown to reddish brown and have several narrow, pale yellow lines on the front wings. A large maroon spot is located at the wing tip. The hindwings are dark brown. The thorax has densely dark reddish brown hairs on the back. The tip of the abdomen consists of a split tuft in males. The antennae are short and double combed. The teeth of the comb in the male are longer than in the female.

The moth flies from May to August in two generations depending on the location.

The larvae feed on Populus and Salix species.

References

Sources
 P.C.-Rougeot, P. Viette (1978). Guide des papillons nocturnes d'Europe et d'Afrique du Nord. Delachaux et Niestlé (Lausanne).

External links

Fauna Europaea
Lepiforum e.V.
De Vlinderstichting 

Notodontidae
Moths of Europe
Moths of Asia
Moths described in 1766
Taxa named by Johann Siegfried Hufnagel